Kyptoceratini is an extinct tribe of the subfamily Synthetoceratinae, deer-like mammals within the family Protoceratidae belonging to the order Artiodactyla, endemic to North America during the Miocene through Pliocene, living 23.03—3.6 Ma, existing for approximately .

Taxonomy
Kyptoceratini is a sister taxa to Synthetoceratini. Kyptoceratini was named by Webb (1981). Its type is Kyptoceras. It was assigned to Synthetoceratinae by Webb (1981), Prothero (1998), Webb et al. (2003) and Prothero and Ludtke (2007).

Members
Kyptoceras (type genus), Syndyoceras

References

Protoceratids
Miocene even-toed ungulates
Pliocene even-toed ungulates
Pliocene extinctions
Prehistoric mammals of North America